American Orthodox writers

Scott Cairns
Fr. Stephen DeYoung
Georges Florovsky
Thomas Hopko
Edith M. Humphrey
Hans Jacobse
Frederica Mathewes-Green
John Meyendorff
Jaroslav Pelikan
Patrick Henry Reardon
Seraphim Rose
Nicholas Samaras
Alexander Schmemann
Frank Schaeffer
Tryfon Tolides

Sources
Derived with permission from List of American writers at OrthodoxWiki.

Writers
Eastern Orthodoxy in the United States
Eastern Orthodoxy in Canada
Eastern Orthodox